The enneg is a bowed string instrument.  It is a traditional instrument of the Seri or Konkaak tribe in northwestern Mexico.  It consists of a rectangular body carved from a block of wood, a bridge and has one string. The instrument is played with a mesquite-and-horsehair bow.  It is used in rites and dances.

References
 

String instruments
Bowed monochords
Musical bows
Mexican musical instruments

es:Categoría:Instrumentos musicales de México